Yüksek Sosyete (English: High Society) is a Turkish television series based on the South Korean drama High Society, it began on 16 June 2016 and ended on 24 December 2016. It is one of the first works of Burak Sağyaşar's Production (Bi Yapım) aired with his second work Aşk Laftan Anlamaz.

Plot  
This television show's plot is taken from the 2015 Korean series High Society. It's also about two different worlds. The first world is Kerem's (Engin Öztürk) world. Kerem is a hard-working man, his parents work in a rich family's house. Kerem always helps their grandson and his best friend Mert (Ozan Dolunay) in everything. One day Mert's grandmother wants him to manage Oliva supermarket. Mert can't manage it so he wants Kerem to manage the supermarket for one month and to exchange each other's name(Mert wanted that Kerem's skills in managing Olivia would help him achieve a great name by exchanging each other's identity). The other world is Cansu's (Hazar Ergüçlü). Cansu is the youngest of her family. She's been always hated by her mother and was told that she brings bad luck to her. Cansu enjoys having fun and being normal, not the way her mother want her to live. One day her mother makes a date for Cansu and Mert. But the date fails so she goes to a café and sees a woman that reads the future. The woman told Cansu that she will love a poor man in a workplace. Cansu goes to work in Oliva supermarket and meets her new friend Ece (Meriç Aral) and also meets Kerem.A magical love story will start between Cansu and Kerem and Ece and Mert.Both couples will encounter many difficulties like Mert is Kerem and Kerem is Mert.Cansu doesn't belong to a poor but belongs to a rich family.

Characters

International broadcasting

References

External links

2016 Turkish television series debuts
2016 Turkish television series endings
Star TV (Turkey) original programming
Turkish television series based on South Korean television series